David Farber  is an American historian. He is the Roy A. Roberts Distinguished Professor of History at the University of Kansas.

Life
He received a BA  from the University of Michigan, and earned a Ph.D. in American history from the University of Chicago. He has also taught at Barnard College, the University of Hawaii, the University of New Mexico, and Temple University. His research encompasses twentieth-century American history, especially the second half of the century.

Bibliography
Farber, David and Bailey, Beth (1992). The First Strange Place: The Alchemy of Sex and Race in WWII Hawaii Johns Hopkins University Press

 
Farber, David (2002). Sloan Rules: Alfred P. Sloan and the Triumph of General Motors University of Chicago Press
 
 

Farber, David (2013-05-03). Everybody Ought to Be Rich: The Life and Times of John J. Raskob, Capitalist. Oxford University Press. 
Farber, David (2019-10-10). Crack: Rock Cocaine, Street Capitalism, and the Decade of Greed Cambridge University Press.

References

External links

David Farber Curriculum Vitae at University of Kansas, retrieved July 30, 2018.

21st-century American historians
American male non-fiction writers
Social historians
Historians of the United States
University of Kansas faculty
Living people
Year of birth missing (living people)
21st-century American male writers